Long-Haired Wonder is a 1974 Soviet drama film directed by Viktor Titov.

Plot 
The film tells the story of a young and very talented Soviet gymnast Olga Korbut, who was called Long-Haired Wonder.

Cast 
 Irina Mazurkevich as Tanya Malisheva (as I. Mazurkevich)
 Anna Zharova as Svetlana Kropotova (as A. Zharova)
 Igor Yasulovich
 Aleksandr Kalyagin
 Naum Dymarsky
 Nina Agapova as Yekaterina Andreyevna Burkova (as N. Agapova)
 Aleksandr Khaletsky as Mitya (as A. Khaletskiy)
 Yelena Bratslavskaya as Yelizabeta Sidelnikova (as Ye. Bratslavskaya)
 Mikaela Drozdovskaya
 Anatoli Kryzhansky

References

External links 
 

1974 films
1970s Russian-language films
Soviet drama films
1974 drama films